María Ignacia Javiera Rafaela Agustina Feliciana Rodríguez de Velasco y Osorio Barba Jimenez Bello De Pereyra Hernandez de Cordoba Salas Solano Garfias, known as la Güera Rodríguez (The rubia Rodríguez) (1778 in Mexico City – 1851 in Mexico City) was a Criolla figure in the society of Mexico City, and a proponent of Mexican independence from Spain.

Through the intercession of Viceroy Juan Vicente de Güemes, 2nd Count of Revillagigedo, she married José Jerónimo López de Peralta de Villar Villamil in September 1794. Eleven years later he died.

She was a proponent of independence, and for this reason was summoned before the tribunal of the Inquisition. After her hearing, Viceroy Francisco Javier de Lizana y Beaumont exiled her to Querétaro for a short time.

She was a good friend of Agustín de Iturbide, future emperor of Mexico, and an admirer of the German naturalist and explorer Alexander von Humboldt. The image of the Virgin on the right of the main altar of the church of La Profesa sculpted by the famous artist Manuel Tolsá is said to be her likeness.

She contracted a second marriage with Mariano de Briones, and a third one with Manual Elizalde. The last years of her life were dedicated to piety, in the Third Order of Franciscans. After her death, Elizalde became a priest.

Artemio del Valle Arizpe wrote a fictionalized biography of her life, La Güera Rodríguez (1949).

Fanny Cano appeared as La Güera Rodríguez in a 1978 Mexican movie of that title.

Biography 
She was born in Mexico City on November 20, 1778 to Antonio Rodríguez de Velasco and María Ignacia Osorio Barba y Bello Pereyra. Her sister was María Josefa Rodríguez de Velasco. Through the arbitration by viceroy Juan Vicente de Güemes and the bishop, she married José Jerónimo López de Peralta de Villar Villamil in September 1794. Though the marriage was unhappy, this union bore the couple four children.

María Ignacia became known in New Spanish society for her beauty and quick wit. Foreign travelers referred to her as, "a sort of western Madame de Stael". Guillermo Prieto, chronicler of the era, said of her, "The Güera was not only noticeable for her beauty, but also for her wit and her place in high society". Artemio de Valle Arizpe meanwhile praised, "the quality of lovers that she had". Some speculate that the image of Our Lady of Sorrows, situated at the right of the altar of the Temple of San Felipe Neri "La Profesa", sculpted by the renowned artist Manuel Tolsá, is based on María Ignacia's features. Likewise, the Inmaculada (Immaculate Conception) in the same cathedral placed on the right-hand wall, could be the daughter of María Ignacia. In the early 1840s, one traveler claimed that "La Güera" had not lost her beauty nor charm: She was "very agreeable, and a perfect living chronicle...in spite of years and of the furrows which it pleases Time to plough in the loveliest faces, La Güera retains a profusion of fair curls without one gray hair, a set of beautiful white teeth, very fine eyes, and great vivacity."

She spent her last years dedicated to religious devotion in the Third Order of Saint Francis. On November 1, 1850 she died in Mexico City. After her death, her husband became a priest. Artemio de Valle Arizpe wrote a biographical novel about her life, La Güera Rodrígez (1949). She was portrayed by Mexican actress Fanny Cano in the 1978 film also entitled La Güera Rodríguez, directed by Felipe Cazals. 

According to some sources, it is said that María Ignacia began a relationship with Simón Bolívar at the age of 16 years when he met her en route to Spain when his ship San Ildefonso stopped in Mexico. Sources, however, are scant with regard to a continued romantic relationship. In her later years, María Ignacia frequently took lovers and husbands. Her first husband, José Jerónimo, beat her and attempted unsuccessfully to shoot her, for which she accused him of attempted murder on July 4, 1802. After the fact, José Jerónimo accused her of committing adultery with her godfather, the cleric and doctor José Mariano Beristáin y Souza, and petitioned for the intervention of the tribunal courts of New Spain and the annulment of the marriage. However, he died in 1805 before receiving the divorce. She was married a second time to Mariano Briones, a wealthy elderly gentleman who died several months later of a chill when, according to legend, she rolled over and took the blankets with her. As a result of his death, María Ignacia inherited his fortune. She married again to Manuel de Elizalde, with whom she remained until her death. After the death of María Ignacia, Manuel de Elizalde embraced a priestly life.

María Ignacia supported the cause of the Mexican rebels with money and through her relationships. She was even accused of heresy for defending independence and for having maintained and agreement with Catholic priest Miguel Hidalgo y Costilla and was brought before the tribunal of the Spanish Inquisition on March 22, 1811, at the same time Juan Sáenz de Mañozca was accused of sexual promiscuity. The charges were eventually dropped for a lack of evidence and after María Ignacia brought to light the lack of morality of the inquisitor, a supposed homosexual. After her trial, viceroy Francisco Javier de Lizana y Beaumont exiled her to Querétaro for a short time.

She had a romantic relationship with Agustín de Iturbide, the future emperor of Mexico, over whom she exercised great political influence. Her relationships allowed her to have access to confidential documents of the era, like the letter sent from Ferdinand VII to viceroy Juan José Ruiz de Apodaca y Eliza in 1820, containing the principles of the future Plan of Iguala, proposing the rise of a popular military leader to negotiate with the rebels. María Ignacia suggested that Iturbide could be that man.

Among those she counted as a friend was German naturalist and explorer Alexander von Humboldt. Their friendship began when she invited him to view a Nopal plantation, after which they were "inseparable". During those years also, it is recorded that while she participated at the unveiling of the equestrian statue of Charles IV, El Cababillito. she was accompanied by Humboldt. According to Artemio de Valle Arizpe, María was dressed in courtly apparel and walked on the arm of the gentleman.

Love Affairs 
Through the intercession of viceroy Juan Vicente de Güemes and the bishop, she married José Jerónimo López de Peralta de Villar Villamil in September 1794,10 who later hit her, accompanied by a bullet impact that did not hit the mark. for which she accused him of attempted murder on July 4, 1802. José Jerónimo later accused her of committing adultery with his compadre, the canon and doctor José Mariano Beristáin y Souza and requested the intervention of the courts of New Spain and the annulment of the marriage, although he died in 1805 before obtaining a divorce. Four children were born from this marriage.1 She married for the second time with Mariano Briones, a wealthy old man, who also died a few months later, the victim of a cold due to the uncovering of blankets, María Ignacia inherited his fortune. She married again, this time with Manuel de Elizalde with whom she remained until his death. Manuel de Elizalde on the death of María Ignacia embraced priestly life.

María Ignacia, supported the insurgent cause with her money and relationships, being even accused of heresy for defending independence and for having maintained a deal with the priest Miguel Hidalgo y Costilla, and brought before the court of the Holy Inquisition, on March 22, 1811, where Juan also accused him Sáenz de Mañozca, inclined to adultery. After her hearing, Viceroy Francisco Javier de Lizana y Beaumont exiled her to Querétaro for a short time. The charges were dropped for lack of evidence, after María Ignacia argued in her defense, bringing out the morality and sexual orientation of the inquisitor.

She had a sentimental relationship with Agustín de Iturbide, future emperor of Mexico, over whom she had great political influence. Her relationships allowed her to have access to confidential documents of the time, such as the letter that Fernando VII sent to Viceroy Apodaca in In 1820, proposing to find a popular man with influence over the army to make deals with the insurgents, from which the principles of the Plan of Iguala were derived. María Ignacia suggested that Iturbide could be that man.

Controversy 
The participation of María Ignacia Rodríguez in the consummation of the Independence of Mexico has been a very controversial issue. According to some sources, he supported Agustín de Iturbide in carrying out the plan for the national freedom of the Mexican people. Artemio del Valle Arizpe argues that "on September 27, 1821, the Trigarante Army made its showy triumphal entry into Mexico [...] The race that the Liberation Army was going to follow would be from Tlaxpana through San Padre, to pass in front of the Viceregal Palace, but Iturbide diverted the column along Profesa street where the house of Doña María Ignacia was located. Rodríguez de Velasco, so that she would witness the parade and see him very arrogant at the head of his undefeated troops". This demonstrated the relationship between Agustín and "La Güera", who influenced, too much, the political vision of the first emperor of Mexico. Her work was not only related to Independence and support for the insurgents, but also for being a transgressor of female duty.

References 
"Rodríguez de Velasco y Osorio Barba, María Ignacia", Enciclopedia de México, v. 12. Mexico City, 1987.
Romero de Terreros, Manuel, Bocetos de la vida social en Nueva España. 1944.

1778 births
1851 deaths
Colonial Mexico
18th-century Mexican people
19th-century Mexican people
Women in the Mexican War of Independence
People from Mexico City
18th-century Mexican women
19th-century Mexican women